Isaac Ginsburg (August 9, 1886 – September 2, 1975) was a Lithuanian-born American ichthyologist.

Biography

Early life
Ginsburg was born in Lithuania in 1886. He immigrated to the United States during his childhood. He attended Cornell University in Ithaca, New York, where he studied ichthyology.

Career and later years
In 1917, Ginsburg worked as an aid for the Division of Fisheries at the United States National Museum. He was appointed to the United States Bureau of Fisheries in 1922 and continued to work there throughout his career. He handled correspondence over marine fish and studied many fish species and their subdivisions. From 1943-44, he was also involved in war work concerning the coordination of fisheries.

Ginsburg was interested in studying the marine fish of the Gulf of Mexico. He was one of the first ichthyologists to note the subtle differences between fish from the gulf and those from the southeastern United States. Ginsburg intended to start a large project devoted to the study of the gulf fish, but most of his time was ultimately spent on the revisionary work which was required. Ginsburg retired in 1956.
He determined that swordfish should be considered kosher, as he found that swordfish have microscopic scales. A sign attesting to this fact hung for many years in the Citarella fish market in Manhattan.

He retired in 1956 and died in 1975.

See also
:Category:Taxa named by Isaac Ginsburg

References

External links
 "Talking Fish" article St. Petersburg Times. Published January 22, 1942.

1886 births
1975 deaths
American ichthyologists
American people of Lithuanian-Jewish descent
Jewish American scientists
Cornell University College of Agriculture and Life Sciences alumni
20th-century American zoologists
Emigrants from the Russian Empire to the United States